Ester Roeck-Hansen (born Ester Linnéa Andersson; 1897–1987) was a Swedish stage and film actress. She was married to the actor Harry Roeck-Hansen.

Selected filmography
 The Million Dollars (1926)
 Hotel Paradis (1931)
 Black Roses (1932)
 Kungliga patrasket (1945)
 The Sixth Commandment (1947)
 Love Wins Out (1949)
 The Nuthouse (1951)
 For the Sake of My Intemperate Youth (1952)
 The Girl in Tails (1956)

References

Bibliography 
 Bo Grandien. Stockholm i lågor. Bonnier, 1968.

Further reading

External links

People from Uddevalla Municipality
1897 births
1987 deaths
Swedish film actresses
Swedish silent film actresses
20th-century Swedish actresses
Swedish stage actresses